Minnesota State Highway 83 (MN 83) is a  highway in south-central Minnesota, which runs from its intersection with State Highway 30 near Waldorf and continues north to its northern terminus at its intersection with State Highway 22 in Mankato.

Route description
State Highway 83 serves as a north–south route in south-central Minnesota between Waldorf, Pemberton, St. Clair, and Mankato.

The highway is legally defined as Legislative Route 201 in the Minnesota Statutes.  It is not marked with this number.

History
State Highway 83 was authorized in 1933 and completely paved by 1953.

At one time, Highway 83 had continued farther west.  The section of present-day State Highway 68 between U.S. Highway 169 (at Mankato) and State Highway 15 (immediately south of New Ulm) was originally designated Highway 83 as well between 1934 and 1963.  Highway 83 was originally marked as an east–west route by its highway shields from beginning to end.

Major intersections

References

083
Transportation in Waseca County, Minnesota
Transportation in Blue Earth County, Minnesota